Themiste is a genus of peanut worms. It is the only genus in the family Themistidae.

Members of this family are filter feeders, and have their feeding tentacles arranged in an elaborate crown-like structure. This is in contrast to other sipunculans which are deposit feeders.

Species 
The genus contains the following species:
 Themiste alutacea (Grube & Ørsted, 1858)
 Themiste blanda (Selenka and de Man, 1883)
 Themiste cymodoceae (Edmonds, 1956)
 Themiste dehamata (Kesteven, 1903)
 Themiste dyscrita (Fisher, 1952)
 Themiste hennahi (Gray, 1828)
 Themiste lageniformis (Baird, 1868)
 Themiste minor (Ikeda, 1904)
 Themiste pyroides (Chamberlain, 1920)
 Themiste variospinosa (Edmonds, 1980)

References 

Sipunculans
Lophotrochozoa genera